Jeannie Ng Ka-yan (born 6 September 1998), better known by her stage name Kayan9896, is a Hong Kong singer. She is known for appearing on a video of "Trial & Error" Youtube Channel, appearing on ViuTV's Drama  and featuring in MC $oHo & KidNey's song "係咁先啦". She released her first solo song "Be around" on 9 December 2021.

Discography

Single 
 Be around (2021)
 Not Too Close (2022)
 Hell No (2022) (English Track)
 Think I'm In Love (2023)

Filmography

Film

Drama

MV Appearance (Actress)

MV Appearance (Girl Group Member)

Awards and nominations

References

External links
Kayan9896's Official Youtube

1998 births
Living people
Alumni of the City University of Hong Kong
Cantopop singers
English-language singers from Hong Kong
21st-century Hong Kong women singers
Hong Kong idols